Sarah Bachrodt is an American artist known for abstract expressionism paintings as well as her work in Interior design.

Background
Sarah Bachrodt was born and raised in Chicago, Illinois in 1944.

Bachrodt art works study self-reflection and spiritual discovery through color, movement and line.

Arts career
After relocating to Boca Raton, Florida in the mid 1980s, Bachrodt was inspired by tropical Florida landscape.

After a career that took her from Miami, New York, and her native Chicago, to Florence, Italy all throughout the 90’s, Bachrodt temporarily disconnected from the gallery circuit and reconnected to her craft with the desire to make art for the purpose of personal fulfillment rather than self-capitalization. She reemerged with a sizeable collection of prized works.

Notable exhibitions
 1990: Gellert Fine Art Gallery, Miami, Florida
 1993: Harid Conservatory, Boca Raton, Florida
 1993- Freites-Revilla Gallery, Boca Raton, Florida
 1994- Freites-Revilla Gallery, Boca Raton, Florida
 1995- Curzon Gallery, Boca Raton, Florida
 1995- Joel Kessler gallery, Miami, Florida
 1996- Florida Atlantic University’s Schmidt Center Gallery, Boca Raton, Florida
 2018 - Palm Beach Modern & Contemporary, West Palm Beach, Florida,

References

1944 births
Living people
Painters from Illinois
Artists from Chicago